The Woodland Park School District is a comprehensive community public school district that serves students in kindergarten through eighth grade from the Borough of Woodland Park (formerly known as West Paterson), in Passaic County, New Jersey, United States.

As of the 2018–19 school year, the district, comprising three schools, had an enrollment of 1,080 students and 88.1 classroom teachers (on an FTE basis), for a student–teacher ratio of 12.3:1.

The district is classified by the New Jersey Department of Education as being in District Factor Group "DE", the fifth-highest of eight groupings. District Factor Groups organize districts statewide to allow comparison by common socioeconomic characteristics of the local districts. From lowest socioeconomic status to highest, the categories are A, B, CD, DE, FG, GH, I and J.

For ninth through twelfth grades, public school students attend Passaic Valley Regional High School, which also serves students from Little Falls and Totowa. The school facility is located in Little Falls. As of the 2018–19 school year, the high school had an enrollment of 1,186 students and 102.0 classroom teachers (on an FTE basis), for a student–teacher ratio of 11.6:1.

Schools
Schools in the district (with 2018–19 enrollment data from the National Center for Education Statistics) are:
Elementary schools
Charles Olbon School with 368 students in grades K-2
Giovanna Irizarry, Principal
Beatrice Gilmore School with 217 students in grades 3-4
Sharon Tomback, Principal
Middle school
Memorial Middle School with 493 students in grades 5-8
Lisa Barreto, Principal

Administration
Members of the district's administration are:
Dr. Michele Pillari, Superintendent
Thomas DiFluri, Business Administrator / Board Secretary

Board of education
The district's board of education, with nine members, sets policy and oversees the fiscal and educational operation of the district through its administration. As a Type II school district, the board's trustees are elected directly by voters to serve three-year terms of office on a staggered basis, with three seats up for election each year held (since 2012) as part of the November general election. The board appoints a superintendent to oversee the day-to-day operation of the district.

References

External links 
Woodland Park School District

School Data for the Woodland Park School District, National Center for Education Statistics
Passaic Valley Regional High School

Woodland Park, New Jersey
New Jersey District Factor Group DE
School districts in Passaic County, New Jersey